was a Japanese lepidopterist. He studied a wide range of moths, in particular the families Zygaenidae, Geometridae, and Pyralidae.  During his career Inoue authored 1042 taxa.

References

Further reading

External links 
 Data related to Hiroshi Inoue (ent.) at Wikispecies

1917 births
2008 deaths
Taxon authorities
Japanese entomologists
Japanese lepidopterists
20th-century Japanese zoologists